Kahuiyeh-ye Olya (also Romanized as Kahū’īyeh-ye ‘Olyā; also known as Kahū’īyeh-ye Bālā) is a village in Gughar Rural District, in the Central District of Baft County, Kerman Province, Iran. At the 2006 census, its population was 22, in 5 families.

References 

Populated places in Baft County